El Hur is a village in Galmudug state located in Hobyo District and south of Hobyo, in the north-central Mudug region of Somalia.

References
Ceel Huur

Populated places in Mudug